Marco Solari (c. 1355 – 1405) was a Swiss–Italian architect, engineer, and sculptor.

Biography 
Marco Solari often named Marco da Carona was born in the village of Carona, in what today is the Swiss canton of Ticino. He is the progenitor of the Solari da Carona family, a masonic Lombardian dynasty.

Solari is known as one of the chief architects of the Certosa di Pavia. Gian Galeazzo Visconti, hereditary lord and first Duke of Milan, first commissioned Solari as a chief architect of the Certosa di Pavia in 1396.

Solari is also known for his work as a master on Duomo of Milan starting in 1399.

Genealogy

References

14th-century Italian architects
Italian engineers
Architects from Ticino
1355 births
1405 deaths